Ivar Kornelius Eikrem (10 August 1898 – 18 October 1994) was a Norwegian politician for the Labour Party.

He was born in Akerø.

He was elected to the Norwegian Parliament from Møre og Romsdal in 1954, and was re-elected on two occasions.

Eikrem was mayor of Nord-Aukra municipality in the period 1945–1947, a regular council member in 1947–1951 and deputy mayor from 1951 to 1959. From 1945 to 1947 he was a member of Vest-Agder county council. He chaired the local party chapter from 1931 to 1940 and 1945 to 1949.

Outside politics he was a farmer.

References

1898 births
1994 deaths
Labour Party (Norway) politicians
Members of the Storting
Mayors of places in Møre og Romsdal
20th-century Norwegian politicians